"Smile" is a song by American musician Uncle Kracker from his fourth studio album, Happy Hour (2009). It was released as the album's first single on July 13, 2009, and again charted in August 2010. The track features pop rock singer Rae Rae, who sings backing vocals throughout the song and at the end of the title. Commercially, the song reached number 31 on the US Billboard Hot 100, number 44 in Canada, and number three in Australia. The song was featured in Bucky Larson: Born to Be a Star.

Music video
A music video for the song was released in September 2009, directed by Darren Doane. The video is set in Northern Michigan with some scenes from Hale, Michigan, and Long Lake, Michigan.

Chart performance
On the chart week of November 7, 2009, the original album version of "Smile" debuted at number 57 on the U.S. Billboard Hot Country Songs chart, becoming his first solo entry on that chart as well as his second chart single since he was featured with Kenny Chesney on "When the Sun Goes Down" in 2004. The song is also his second entry on the Hot Country Songs charts, debuting at number 57 on the week of November 7, 2009. On the Billboard Hot 100, the song reached number 31. Following strong unsolicited airplay of a remix of "Smile" featuring country music influences on Detroit country music stations, "Smile" was re-mixed and released to country radio as an official single to promote his extended play Happy Hour: The South River Road Sessions. It has since become his first solo top-10 country hit, peaking at number six.

Outside the United States, the song charted in a few other countries. In Canada, the song debuted at number 98 on the Canadian Hot 100
on May 15, 2010, and reached number 44 on its 13th week. It then dropped out of the top 100 the next week. In Europe, the song appeared on the charts of Germany and Austria, but did not break the top 30 in either country. The song's highest peak on any country's national chart was in Australia, where it reached number three on the ARIA Singles Chart on July 11, 2010, three weeks after its debut at number 36. It stayed in the top 50 for 14 more weeks, totaling 18 weeks on the chart altogether, and finished 2010 as Australia's 54th-best-selling single.

Uses on television
"Smile" has been featured in promotions for The Office special "Baby" episode as well as TV advertisements for Season 3 of the Australian drama series Packed to the Rafters. Joe McElderry recorded a cover of the song for his album Wide Awake, which was released in October 2010. The song was featured in an episode of the 2009 sequel to Melrose Place. Kelly Ripa had the song played to an accompanying montage in tribute to co-host Regis Philbin on his last episode of Live with Regis & Kelly, following his retirement from the series. Cold Stone also used the song in their commercials.

Charts

Weekly charts

Year-end charts

Certifications

References

External links
 

Uncle Kracker songs
2009 singles
2009 songs
Atlantic Records singles
Country ballads
Song recordings produced by Rob Cavallo
Songs written by Blair Daly
Songs written by J. T. Harding
Songs written by Uncle Kracker